Jonny Yull (born 5 March 2005), is an Australian professional footballer who plays as a midfielder for Adelaide United.

Club career

Adelaide United
In December 2020, Yull was named to Adelaide United's senior squad against Western United. In June 2021, he signed a senior scholarship contract. Yull made two appearances in the 2020–21 A-League season becoming the third youngest player to feature for Adelaide United at 15 years 321 days old but did not feature for the club in the 2021–22 A-League Men season.

In July 2022, Yull went on trial at English Premier League club Chelsea in the hope of signing with their academy.

References

External links

2005 births
Living people
Australian soccer players
Association football midfielders
Adelaide United FC players
National Premier Leagues players
A-League Men players